Monserrate and DJ Urba (also known as Los Jedys) are reggaeton producers from Puerto Rico and the Dominican Republic, respectively. They have been on the business for some years, but they really got a start when Daddy Yankee hired them to produce his Barrio Fino Album. Then they followed up with the Barrio Fino en Directo Album. They are aligned with Luny Tunes's Mas Flow Inc and Daddy Yankee's El Cartel Records.

DJ Monserrate 
Alex A. Monserrate Sosa, artistically known as DJ Monserrate From a young age, he showed passion for music and after overcoming various obstacles, he has now become a very well respected musical producer in the reggaeton community. Monserrate has worked with artists such as Daddy Yankee and his notorious El Cartel Records (Dale Caliente, No Me Dejes Solo, Rompe, Machete, Taladro, El Muro, ¿Qué Vas a Hacer?, El Truco, and other hits). Monserrate has also worked with other Reggaeton artist, like Wisin & Yandel, Tego Calderón, Yaviah, Alexis & Fido, and also produced for artists outside the reggaeton world doing their remixes, such as Carlos Vives, Thalía, Cabas, among others. Monserrate won his first Latin Grammy in 2005 as musical producer of Daddy Yankee's Barrio Fino, which reported sales of 2 million copies and counting. Monserrate works alongside DJ Urba, both producers are currently working in their upcoming production titled Los Jedays which is set to be released soon. Monserrate had been diagnosed with Lymphoma non-hodgking cancer disease, after getting treatment in Puerto Rico he overcame this disease. He continues to work with artist on their albums' including Tito El Bambino's El Patron and Ivy Queen's Sentimiento.

Monserrate teamed up with Sosa since 2016.

DJ Urba 
Urba continues working production on other themes on 2010 and 2011. He was previously in a relationship with fellow reggaeton artist Ivy Queen from mid-2006 to 2007, he and Monserrate produced a chunk of her studio album Sentimiento including the lead single "Que Lloren".

Urba teamed up with DJ Rome since 2016, and work again with Daddy Yankee to produce "Shaky Shaky" and "Dura".

Production credits

2003 
Los Homerun-es - Daddy Yankee
 14. No Te Canses, El Funeral ft. Julio Voltio

2004 
El Sobreviviente - Wisin
 04. Saoco ft. Daddy Yankee

Barrio Fino - Daddy Yankee
 03. Dale Caliente
 04. No Me Dejes Solo ft. Wisin & Yandel
 07. El Muro

2005 
Barrio Fino en Directo - Daddy Yankee
 11. Rompe
 16. El Truco

Pa'l Mundo, Deluxe Edition - Wisin & Yandel
 1. Te noto tensa ft. Tony Dize
 2. Toma Ft Franco el Gorila

Peso Completo - John Eric
 10. Tembleque
 12. Bailen ft. Zion & Lennox

2006 
Respect - Lisa M
 02. Fuego
 03. Asi Es Que Eh ft. Hurricane G, La Bruja, K-mil & Miss Waidy
 04. Hazme Tuya
 05. Fuete
 06. Hey Ladies

Los Vaqueros - Wisin & Yandel
 04. Eléctrica ft. Gadiel
 07. Mujerón ft. El Tío
 12. Chu Chin ft. El Tío
 14. Un Viaje ft. Gadiel
 17. Round 3 ft. Franco "El Gorila"
 18. Yo Quiero Hacerte El Amor ft. Franco "El Gorila" & El Tío
 19. Calienta y Pega ft. El Tío
 21. Sal del Callejón ft. Franco "El Gorila"

2007 
Masterpiece: Commemorative Edition - R.K.M & Ken-Y
 02. Dame Lo Que Quiero (New Version)

Sentimiento - Ivy Queen
 02. Que Lloren
 06. Reza Por Mi
 08. Yo Te Rescaté
 11. Cuando No Me Tengas

It's My Time - Tito El Bambino
 02. El Tra
 05. El Bum Bum
 09. Solo Dime Que Sí
 15. Sol, Playa & Arena Ft. Jadiel

The Bad Boy: The Most Wanted Edition - Héctor el Father
 Disc:2 /05. Mensaje De Voz Ft. Naldo

Wisin vs. Yandel: Los Extraterrestres - Wisin & Yandel
 07. Dime Quiénes Son (produced with Victor "El Nasi" and Nesty)

The Black Carpet  - Nicky Jam
 Gas Pela Ft. RKM

2008 
Lo Mejor De Mi - Jadiel

 07. Sol & Arena Pt.2
 17. Calentamiento Ft. Franco "El Gorila"

El Fenomeno - Arcangel

 08. I Got Flow

Ivy Queen 2008 World Tour LIVE!

 01. "Dime"
 02. "Que Lloren" (Live)
 07. "Reza Por Mi" (Live)
 18. "Dime" (Bachata Version)

2009 
El Patron - Tito El Bambino
 01. "El Amor"
 02. "Suéltate"
 03. "Mata"
 04. "Desnudarte"
 05. "Mi Cama Huele a Ti" (Feat. Zion & Lennox)
 06. "Piropo"
 07. "Baila Sexy"
 08. "Perfumate"
 09. "Te Comencé a Querer"
 10. "Agárrala" (Feat. Plan B)
 11. "Te Extraño"
 12. "Under"
 13. "Se Me Daña La Mente"
 14. "Somos Iguales"

Down to Earth - Alexis & Fido
 08. Súbete (Official Remix) (Feat. Don Omar) (produced by Urba with Tainy, Doble A & Nales and Master Chris)

Welcome to the Jungle - Franco "El Gorila"
 08. Psiquiatrica Loca (produced by Monserrrate with Sosa)

El Momento - Jowell & Randy
 Amanecer (feat. Yandel & Gadiel) (produced by Monserrrate with Tainy and Marioso)

2010 
Drama Queen Deluxe Edition
 15. Dime

References 

Puerto Rican reggaeton musicians
Reggaeton record producers